Skilly Peak is a conspicuous rock peak  northeast of Shiver Point and  northeast of Eduard Nunatak on the east coast of Graham Land, Antarctica. It surmounts Rogosh Glacier to the north and Artanes Bay to the southeast.

The peak was surveyed by Falkland Islands Dependencies Survey (FIDS) in 1947 and 1955. "Skilly" means a thin soup; the name arose because the 1955 FIDS party was short of rations, and pemmican and porridge were very thin.

Mountains of Graham Land
Oscar II Coast